Didier Jeanpier La Torre Arana (born 21 March 2002) is a Peruvian footballer who until August 5th 2021 played as a midfielder or attacker for Osijek.

Career

La Torre started his career with Alianza Lima, where he made two league appearances. However, they were relegated during the 2020 season.

On 18 January 2021, La Torre signed for Emmen in the Netherlands. On 31 January, he made his debut for the team during a 2–0 loss to Willem II.

References

External links
 
 

Living people
2002 births
Peruvian footballers
Peru youth international footballers
Association football forwards
Association football midfielders
Club Alianza Lima footballers
FC Emmen players
Peruvian Primera División players
Eredivisie players
Peruvian expatriate footballers
Peruvian expatriate sportspeople in the Netherlands
Expatriate footballers in the Netherlands
Footballers from Lima
Peruvian people of French descent